Un novio para dos hermanas ("A Boyfriend for Two Sisters") is a 1967 Mexican film. It stars Pili & Mili. Sara García plays Seňora Cáceres.

Cast

External links
 

1967 films
Mexican romantic comedy films
1960s Spanish-language films
Films shot in Mexico City
Films directed by Luis César Amadori
Films produced by Benito Perojo
Films with screenplays by Roberto Gómez Bolaños
Films scored by Manuel Esperón
1960s Mexican films
Mexican musical comedy films